Dafydd Rhys James (born 24 July 1975) is a Welsh former rugby union footballer who played on the wing or in the centre. He toured with the British & Irish Lions in 2001. James was born in Mufulira, Zambia, but earned 48 caps for Wales and three for the British & Irish Lions. His clubs include; Kenfig Hill RFC, Llanelli, Bridgend, Pontypridd, Harlequins, Scarlets, Cardiff Blues, Sale Sharks and HKCC Rugby.

Domestic career
James began his professional rugby career at Bridgend RFC in 1995 after coming up through the ranks of Kenfig Hill RFC. After 43 appearances for Bridgend, he moved to Pontypridd RFC in 1997, where he played his part in the infamous Battle of Brive (Heineken cup clash 1997) and went on to make 54 club appearances in two years. In 1999 James moved to West Wales to play his rugby and enjoyed his first stint at Llanelli playing 52 games and scoring 145 points. He returned to Bridgend in 2001 (which later became the Celtic Warriors regional side in 2003), 2004 saw James move to London to play for Harlequins, before being temped back to Wales only a year later to return for the Llanelli Scarlets where he stayed until 2009.

James scored over 565 points in his career and was the first to score over 25 tries in Heineken cup and scored 29 tries overall.

International career
James made his international debut for Wales in 1996, playing against Australia in Sydney. He went on to win 48 caps in 11 years and scored 15 tries. His last cap came at the 2007 Rugby World Cup.

In 2001, James played all three Tests for the British & Irish Lions in Australia, scoring one of their four tries in the opening Test victory.

References

External links
 
 
 Dafydd James Fitness
 

1975 births
Zambian people of British descent
Bridgend RFC players
British & Irish Lions rugby union players from Wales
Harlequin F.C. players
Kenfig Hill RFC players
Living people
Llanelli RFC players
People educated at Ysgol Brynteg
People from Mufulira
Pontypridd RFC players
Rugby union centres
Rugby union wings
Scarlets players
Sale Sharks players
Wales international rugby union players
Welsh rugby union players
Zambian emigrants to the United Kingdom
Zambian people of English descent